Requiem is the second album by Australian alternative rock band The Getaway Plan which was released on 4 November 2011.

The album notably sees a departure from the band's previous post-hardcore sound, in favour of more of an alternative rock sound.

Background 
On 19 November 2010, the band announced through their website that they would officially be reforming and writing new music. The band headed off to Canada in April to record the new album with producer David Bottrill (Muse, Tool, Silverchair). They tracked the bed tracks at Phase One Studios. Along with these two announcements they also confirmed a tour, dubbed "The Getaway Plan: Reclamation" tour, beginning in February 2011, in celebration of their reformation. This marked the end of the countdowns sequenced on their website.

On 14 April 2011, it was confirmed in a short video posted on the band's official website and tumblr that the new album marking their reformation was titled "Requiem" with a tentative release of September 2011.

On 18 August 2011, The Getaway Plan released a song, "Phantoms" from the upcoming album on their official Facebook page. The first single, "The Reckoning", was announced in August, with the official video  released on 22 September. As revealed in a couple of their videos, the release date for the album was confirmed as 4 November 2011 through We Are Unified.

In late September, the band posted a link to a third new song, "Flying Colours". The link was later taken down. "Flying Colours", as well as two other new songs "February" and "Requiem" were previewed on Richard Kingsmill's triple j radio show on 30 September. Additionally, a song titled "Move Along" was put up, along with "The Reckoning", "Phantoms" and "Flying Colours" on The Getaway Plan's facebook page.

On 1 November, three days before album release, the band created an app for iPhone/iPod touch which contained new music (including "Move Along") and band news. The album was put up for streaming at  a day before release.

'Requiem' was released through We Are Unified on 4 November 2011.

Charts

Track listing 
All lyrics written by Matthew Wright, all music composed by The Getaway Plan

Personnel 
 Matthew Wright – Lead vocals, piano, rhythm guitar
 Clint Owen Ellis – Lead guitar
 Dave Anderson – Bass guitar
 Aaron Barnett – Drums, percussion
Additional Personnel

 David Bottrill - Producer, Mixer
 Michael Phillips - Engineer
 Dajaun Martineau - Assistant Tracking Engineer
 Robbie Grunwald - Organ, Keyboards
 Steve Zsirai - Upright Bass on 'Child of Light'

 CJ Bolland - Programming on 'The Reckoning'
 Kevin Fox - Strings, Horns and Woodwinds arrangement
 Sterling Hall School Boys Choir - Vocals on Tracks 1, 6, 7, 8.
 Sharon Riley & The Faith Chorale - Vocals on Tracks 1, 8, 10, 11

References 

2011 albums
The Getaway Plan albums